Belison, officially the Municipality of Belison, is a 5th class municipality in the province of Antique, Philippines. According to the 2020 census, it has a population of 14,129 people. Making it 18th most populous, the smallest municipality in the province of Antique and the smallest in Panay island in both area and population.

Belison is the smallest (in area and population) and the youngest municipality in the province of Antique.

History
Belison was merely a barangay in the larger municipality of Patnongon, adjacent to the north. Belison barangay leaders and Manila-based s (‘Belison residents’) mapped out a petition requesting the national government to make Belison an independent town. The petition was brought to Malacañan Palace on March 10, 1961, and through Presidential Executive Order No. 421 signed by President Carlos P. Garcia, Belison was declared a municipality - the smallest and the youngest in the Province of Antique.

During World War II, Japanese war submarines and other marine craft found the shores of Belison easy entry points to Panay, and invaded the Western Visayas in that location. People still tell of the fear created by these foreign intruders, and also of the bravery of those who decided to resist, creating rebel strongholds in the mountainous areas above the municipality.

When the Japanese air raids would bomb Belison and the nearby communities, families from all around fled to Guinobatan Cave, high in the hills of barangay Buenavista. And when the American forces came, they too used the smooth sea landing in Belison, bringing relief food supplies to s, and troops to attack the Japanese occupying forces. They often used local homes in the area to hide in while planning their strategies for assault against the enemy, and enlisted the help of brave men and women to carry out their plans.

Geography

According to the Philippine Statistics Authority, the municipality has a land area of  constituting  of the  total area of Antique.

The municipality is bounded on the east by San Remigio, southeast by Sibalom, south by San Jose de Buenavista, north by Patnongon, and west by the Cuyo East Pass.

Climate

Barangays
Belison is politically subdivided into 11 barangays, each with a duly constituted government unit known as the barangay council headed by the barangay captain. The Poblacion, seat of the municipal government, is an urban barangay. The other 10 are considered rural.

Demographics

In the 2020 census, Belison had a population of 14,129.

Religion
Nine (9) of the leading Christian religious dominations in the Philippines established their presence in the town. Most s are of Aglipayan ancestry.
 Aglipayan or the members of the Iglesia Filipina Independiente (Parish of Our Lady of Purity & Candles) have a church along Delima Street.
 Roman Catholics, there is the Lady of Candles Parish located along Oliverio Street.
 Seventh-day Adventist Church located along Placer Street.
 Iglesia ni Cristo has two locales, one in Candelaria Street, Poblacion and another in National Road, Barangay Rombang.
 Assembly of God located along Candelaria Street.
 Belison Baptist Church located along Rizal Street.
 Born Again Church located in Barangay Maradiona.
 United Pentecostal Church is located along National Road (Barangay Poblacion).
 Victory Christian Church is located along Bajalan-Lancara Street.

Economy

Agriculture continues to be the heartbeat of the town. More than half of its land is riceland, while the rest are planted to corn, coconut, sugar cane and other production like vegetables and peanuts.

Government

Municipal seal
The Belison municipal seal was created to commemorate the agricultural heritage of the town, in order to preserve the legacy of the original settlers in the region. It depicts three mainstay agricultural activities:
 The top image represents fishing and the bounties of the neighboring sea.
 The lower left portion is the harvesting of sugar cane, its processing muscovado sugar.
 The lower right depicts tilling of the lowlands for the planting of rice and other grains and vegetables.

Surrounding the great triangle are eleven stars – one representing each barangay in the town.  The largest star at the bottom is for the Poblacion. Their strength lies in their connectivity to one another, and in their closeness to the traditions of the past.

References

External links
 [ Philippine Standard Geographic Code]

Municipalities of Antique (province)
Establishments by Philippine executive order